The Proclamation of Rebellion, officially titled A Proclamation for Suppressing Rebellion and Sedition, was the response of George III to the news of the Battle of Bunker Hill at the outset of the American Revolution. Issued on 23 August 1775, it declared elements of the American colonies in a state of "open and avowed rebellion". It ordered officials of the empire "to use their utmost endeavours to withstand and suppress such rebellion". The 1775 proclamation of rebellion also encouraged subjects throughout the empire, including those in Britain, to report anyone carrying on "traitorous correspondence" with the rebels to be punished.

Implementation 
The Proclamation of Rebellion was drafted before Colonial Secretary Lord Dartmouth had been given a copy of the Second Continental Congress's Olive Branch Petition. Because King George III refused to receive the colonial petition, the Proclamation of Rebellion of 23 August 1775 effectively served as an answer to it.

On 27 October, North's Cabinet expanded on the proclamation in the Speech from the Throne read by King George III at the opening of Parliament. The King's speech insisted that rebellion was being fomented by a "desperate conspiracy" of leaders whose claims of allegiance to the King were insincere; what the rebels really wanted, he said, was to create an "independent empire". The speech indicated that King George intended to deal with the crisis with armed force and was even considering "friendly offers of foreign assistance" to suppress the rebellion without pitting Briton against Briton. A pro-American minority of members within Parliament at the time warned the government was driving the colonists towards independence, something many colonial leaders insisted they did not desire.

American response 
On 6 December 1775, the Continental Congress issued a response to the Proclamation of Rebellion saying that, while they had always been loyal to the King, Parliament never had legitimate claim to authority over them, because the colonies were not democratically represented. Congress argued it was their duty to continue resisting Parliament's violations of the British Constitution, and that they would retaliate if any supporters in Great Britain were punished for "favouring, aiding, or abetting the cause of American liberty". America still hoped to avoid the "calamities" of a "civil war". The King's proclamation and the speech from the throne undermined moderates in Congress like John Dickinson, who had been arguing the King would find a way to resolve the dispute between colonies and Parliament. When it became clear George III was not inclined to act as a conciliator, attachment to empire was weakened, and a movement towards independence became a reality, culminating in America's Declaration of Independence on the 4th of July 1776.

Revocation 
 
King George III addressed the opening session of Parliament on 5 December 1782 in a Speech from the Throne. It was his first address since the resignation of  Lord North as his wartime Prime Minister, which was delivered in the last session at Parliament's resolution to end offensive war in North America. In the intervening time the King assured his Lords and Gentlemen that he had lost no time ordering the end of "the further prosecution of offensive war upon the continent of North America".

After considering his option to renounce the British crown and retire to his German estates as Prince of Brunswick in the Holy Roman Empire, George III reassured Parliament that he would follow the wishes of "my Parliament and my people" as he had promised at his coronation Speech from the Throne. George III then reported to the joint session that he had offered the US Congress his declaration of the rebelling North American colonies as "free and independent states" in the final treaty of peace and gave notice to Parliament that had been agreed upon, as well as other preliminary terms.

His closing remark on American independence was, "Religion, language, interest, affections may, and I hope will, yet prove a bond of permanent union between the two countries. To this end, neither attention nor disposition shall be wanting on my part."

References 

1775 documents
1775 establishments in the British Empire
Documents of the American Revolution
George III of the United Kingdom
Government documents of the United Kingdom
History of the Thirteen Colonies
Politics of the Kingdom of Great Britain
Proclamations
Sedition
St James's